Luan de Bruin (born 13 February 1993 in Pretoria, South Africa) is a South African rugby union player for  Edinburgh Rugby. His regular position is tighthead prop.

Career

Youth and Varsity Cup rugby

De Bruin got recognised for provincial selection at primary school level in 2006, when he was included in the  Under-13 squad that played at the Craven Week competition. In 2009, he was selected in their Under-16 Grant Khomo Week squad and he played at the Under-18 Craven Week competitions in both 2010 and 2011. After the 2011 tournament, he was included in a South African Academy side that played against a France Under-18 side in Durban.

In 2012, De Bruin moved to Bloemfontein. He made eleven appearances for the  side during the 2012 Under-19 Provincial Championship, starting ten of those matches. At the start of the 2013 season, he played for university side  during the 2013 Varsity Cup competition, where he made six substitute appearances.

He was selected in the South African Under-20 side that played in the 2013 IRB Junior World Championship in France. He started in their first two pool matches, a 97–0 victory over the United States and a 31–24 victory over eventual champions England. He didn't feature in their match against hosts France, but was restored to the starting line-up in their semi-final clash with Wales, where South Africa suffered an 18–17 defeat. He was also in the run-on side that met New Zealand in the third-placed play-off and De Bruin scored one of six South African tries as they beat New Zealand 41–34 to secure a third-place finish in the tournament.

Free State Cheetahs / Cheetahs

De Bruin's first taste of senior provincial rugby came during the 2014 Vodacom Cup competition for the  after the 2014 Varsity Cup concluded.

In July 2014, De Bruin signed a new contract with the  until the end of 2016.

Leicester Tigers

On 11 November 2020 de Bruin's signature was announced by Leicester Tigers for the 2020-21 Premiership Rugby season. He played 17 times in his single season for Leicester.

Edinburgh

On 9 March 2021, de Bruin would move to Scotland to join Pro14 side Edinburgh ahead of the 2021-22 season.

References

South African rugby union players
Living people
1993 births
Rugby union players from Pretoria
Rugby union props
Cheetahs (rugby union) players
Free State Cheetahs players
South Africa Under-20 international rugby union players
Leicester Tigers players
Edinburgh Rugby players